Johann Georg von Werdenstein (1542–1608), canon of Augsburg and Eichstätt, was the owner of a very substantial library consisting of tens of thousands of books. 

Werdenstein came from an aristocratic family and entered the Catholic Church, becoming a canon of
Augsburg Cathedral in 1563, and adding a further canonry at Eichstatt in 1567.

Around 9,000 volumes from his library including many musical items were purchased  in 1592  for 6,000 florins by William V, Duke of Bavaria, for the Ducal Library in Munich, now the Bavarian State Library.

References

1542 births
1608 deaths
16th-century German Roman Catholic priests
German librarians
People from Augsburg